Carlos B. Scott, Jr. (born July 2, 1960) is a former American football offensive lineman who played with the St. Louis Cardinals of the National Football League. He played college football at UTEP.

Early life 
Scott was born July 2, 1960, in Hempstead, Texas, and grew up in nearby Waller. He attended Waller High School where he was a three-sport athlete in football, basketball, and track, and was the Texas Class 2A State shot put champion from 1976 to 1978. As a football player, he earned all-district honors. He graduated from Waller in 1978.

College career 
Scott attended the University of Texas at El Paso on an athletic scholarship and played football and track at the university.

As a football player, Scott lettered from 1978 to 1981 and was made the team's MVP in 1982. In track, he competed in shot put and discus. He was the WAC indoor shot put champion from 1980 to 1982 and discus champion in 1980.

He later returned to the school to graduate in 1989 with a bachelor's degree in education.

Professional football career

St. Louis Cardinals 
Scott was selected in the seventh round of the 1983 NFL Draft by the St. Louis Cardinals. He was with the team for three seasons from 1983 to 1985, playing in 45 games total with one start in 1983.

Scott was released by the Cardinals on August 22, 1986.

Denver Broncos 
In 1987, Scott served as a replacement player for the Denver Broncos during the 1987 NFL players' strike, though he never actually appeared in any of the three replacement games.

After football 
Scott continued to participate in discus events after his NFL career, finishing fourth in the 1992 Olympic Trials, third in the 1994 USA Nationals, and first in the 1994 US Olympic Festival discus championship. He was also a member of Team USA at the 1995 Pan American Games.

References 

1960 births
Living people
African-American players of American football
American football centers
American football offensive tackles
American male discus throwers
American male shot putters
Denver Broncos players
National Football League replacement players
People from Waller County, Texas
Players of American football from Texas
St. Louis Cardinals (football) players
UTEP Miners football players
UTEP Miners men's track and field athletes